Statistics of Kuwaiti Premier League for the 1983–84 season.

Overview
It was contested by 14 teams, and Al Arabi Kuwait won the championship.

League standings

References
Kuwait - List of final tables (RSSSF)

1984
1983–84 in Asian association football leagues
1